"Ballad (Namonaki Koi no Uta)" is the 10th Japanese single released by alan. The song is the theme song of the same-titled movie starring Tsuyoshi Kusanagi and Yui Aragaki.

The single also contains the previously released digital single Shiawase no Kane.

The single debuted at #11 the first week selling 5,988 copies, the second week it fell to #22 selling 2,948 copies, total to date it's sold 10,696 copies.

Track listing

CD 
 
 
 "Ballad (Namonaki Koi no Uta)" (Instrumental)
 "Shiawase no Kane" (Instrumental)

DVD 
 "Ballad (Namonaki Koi no Uta)" (Music video)
 Making of "Ballad (Namonaki Koi no Uta)"

2009 singles
Alan Dawa Dolma songs
2009 songs
Avex Trax singles
Japanese film songs